The National University of San Luis (in Spanish, Universidad Nacional de San Luis, UNSL) is a public university in Argentina, with its seat in the city of San Luis, capital of the province of the same name, in the Cuyo region. It was created in 1973, along with the National University of San Juan, split off the National University of Cuyo based in Mendoza.

Facilities and other institutions
UNSL has eight faculties:
 Faculty of Physico-Mathematical and Natural Sciences
 Faculty of Human Sciences
 Faculty of Psychology
 Faculty of Health Sciences
 Faculty of Engineering and Agricultural Sciences
 Faculty of Economico legal and Social Sciences
 Faculty of Tourism and Urban planning
 Faculty of Chemistry, Biochemistry and Pharmacy

Other institutions depending on it are:
 Juan Pascual Pringles Normal School
 San Luis Applied Mathematics Institute (IMASL)
 Applied Physics Research Institute (INFAP)
 Chemical Technology Research Institute (INTEQUI)
 Open and Distance Education Department (DEDA)
 Technico-Instrumental Teaching Department (DETI)
 Educational Alternatives Laboratory
 Educational Informatics Center
 Interdisciplinary Service Center

References

 Universidad Nacional de San Luis — Institutional website.

See also
 List of Argentine universities

1973 establishments in Argentina
San Luis
Educational institutions established in 1973
Universities in San Luis Province